"The Bard's Song (In the Forest)" is a single by German power metal band Blind Guardian, released in 2003. It contains five different versions of this track, one of their most popular songs, which originally appeared on the album Somewhere Far Beyond. The song is a folk rock ballad, in contrast to the band's usual power metal sound.

The single's cover art was painted by Leo Hao.

At concerts, it is not unusual for Hansi Kürsch to only sing the first and third lines of the song, then possibly the final verse or chorus, and leave the audience to sing the rest.

The song has been covered by German a cappella metal band van Canto on their album Hero.

Track listing 
 "The Bard's Song (In the Forest)" (New Studio Version) – 3:30	 
 "The Bard's Song (In the Forest)" (Live, Milano, October 10, 2002) – 4:32
 "The Bard's Song (In the Forest)" (Live, Munich, May 5, 2002) – 4:29
 "The Bard's Song (In the Forest)" (Live, Madrid, June 4, 2002) – 4:30
 "The Bard's Song (In the Forest)" (multimedia track: Live, Stuttgart, May 6, 2002) – 4:18

Charts

#40 Germany   
  
#31 Italy

Personnel 
 Hansi Kürsch – vocals and strings arrangement
 André Olbrich – acoustic lead guitar and backing vocals
 Marcus Siepen – acoustic rhythm guitar and backing vocals

References 

1992 songs
2003 singles
Blind Guardian songs
Fantasy music
Virgin Records singles
Songs written by Hansi Kürsch
Songs written by André Olbrich